Willington José Ortiz Palacio (born March 26, 1952 in Tumaco) is a Colombian former professional footballer who played as forward or winger. He played 49 times for the Colombia national team scoring 12 goals and is the top Colombian player in the IFFHS's rank of South American Player of the Century.

Career
Ortiz started his illustrious career at striker in 1971 in the youth system of Millonarios, made his first team debut against Internacional de Porto Alegre scoring the game-winning goal. He won the DIMAYOR Colombian First Division Championship (now the Categoría Primera A) with Millonarios in 1972, and 1978. He played with Millonarios until 1979, participating in the Copa Libertadores 1973, 1974, 1976, and 1979 with the club. In 1980, Ortiz was transferred to Deportivo Cali and played for them for three seasons. Willington was transferred to América de Cali in late 1982, and won the Colombian Domestic league title (now Copa Mustang) in 1983, 1984, 1985, and 1986.

Colombian National Squad
Ortiz played for the Colombia Olympic team at the 1972 Summer Olympics. He played in three editions of Copa América in 1975, 1979 and 1983 reaching the final in 1975. He also played for the Colombian Senior National Team that took part in qualifiers for the  FIFA World Cup in 1974, 1978, 1982, and 1986.

Titles

References

External links

 Colombian links profile
 Millonarios profile
 América profile

1952 births
Living people
Colombian footballers
Colombia international footballers
Deportivo Cali footballers
Millonarios F.C. players
América de Cali footballers
Categoría Primera A players
Olympic footballers of Colombia
Footballers at the 1972 Summer Olympics
1975 Copa América players
1979 Copa América players
1983 Copa América players
People from Tumaco
Association football midfielders
Sportspeople from Nariño Department